Chandwaji is a town in Jaipur district, Rajasthan, India.

Geography

References

Cities and towns in Jaipur district